Silent Hill is a 2006 supernatural horror film directed by Christophe Gans and written by Roger Avary, based on the video game series of the same name published by Konami. It is the first installment in the Silent Hill film series. The film stars Radha Mitchell, Sean Bean, Laurie Holden, Deborah Kara Unger, Kim Coates, Tanya Allen, Alice Krige, and Jodelle Ferland. The film follows Rose, who takes her adopted daughter, Sharon, to the town of Silent Hill, for which Sharon cries while sleepwalking. Rose is involved in a car accident near the town and awakens to find Sharon missing. While searching for her daughter, she fights a local cult and begins to uncover Sharon's connection to the town's dark past.

After attempting to gain the film rights to Silent Hill for five years, Gans sent a video interview to Konami explaining his plans for adapting it and how important the games were to him. Konami awarded him the film rights as a result, and he and Avary began working on the script in 2004. Avary used Centralia, Pennsylvania as an inspiration for the town. Principal photography began in April 2005 and lasted three months with an estimated $50 million budget, and was shot on sound sets and on location in Ontario, Canada. Most of the monsters encountered in the film were played by professional dancers, while a minority were created with CGI.

Silent Hill was released theatrically in Canada on April 21, 2006, by Alliance Atlantis; in France on April 26, by Metropolitan Filmexport and grossed $100.6 million worldwide. The film received generally negative reviews from critics upon release, although retrospective reviews have been more favorable.

A sequel, Silent Hill: Revelation, was released in October 2012, while another sequel, Return to Silent Hill, has been announced to be in early development.

Plot
Rose Da Silva and her husband Christopher are disturbed by their adopted daughter Sharon's constant sleepwalking and nightmares about Silent Hill, a town in West Virginia that was abandoned in the 1970s due to a massive coal seam fire. Desperate for a solution, Rose takes Sharon on a trip to Silent Hill to find answers. Her erratic behavior concerns police officer Cybil Bennett when they encounter her at a gas station en route. As they enter Silent Hill, a girl steps out into the road, causing Rose to crash and blackout. She awakens in the fog-shrouded dimension of Silent Hill, and realizes that Sharon is missing.

Searching the town for Sharon, Rose pursues the girl she encountered prior to the crash, who resembles Sharon. At various points, the town suddenly transitions into a nightmarish world inhabited by inhuman monsters, including the fearsome Pyramid Head. Cybil encounters and tries to arrest Rose, but while attempting to bring her to the local station, they realize they are trapped, all roads out of town ending in a mysterious cliff. Rose encounters many other inhuman creatures and learns of Alessa Gillespie, a young girl burned as a witch by the Brethren, the town's fanatical Manichean cult. Her mother Dahlia wanders the streets as an outcast, guilt-ridden over her negligence that led to Alessa's suffering. In the real world, Christopher searches the abandoned town with policeman Thomas Gucci, but they find nothing: the town appears to them simply as a dilapidated, abandoned place devoid of fog or creatures. Gucci later reveals he lived in Silent Hill and saved Alessa from the fire. He encourages Christopher to end his futile search.

In the Silent Hill dimension, Rose encounters the girl again, revealed to be an aspect of Alessa. When the town transitions into the dark dimension, Rose, Cybil, and Anna, a Brethren member, flee to an old church, but Pyramid Head catches and flays Anna alive. Brethren members lead Rose and Cybil to a hospital, claiming the demon that has taken Sharon is in the basement. Upon noticing an image of Sharon in Rose's locket, Christabella, the high priestess of the Brethren, identifies Sharon as a likeness of Alessa. She decries the two women as witches and orders her Brethren to stop them. Cybil holds them off while Rose descends into the basement, but is quickly subdued and captured.

Rose explores the basement but is barricaded by a group of disfigured nurses. She sneaks past them and enters Alessa's room. In a flashback, it is revealed that Alessa was stigmatized by the townspeople for being born out of wedlock. Christabella convinced Dahlia to "purify" Alessa after Alessa was raped by the school janitor. Christabella immolated Alessa during a ritual in 1974, but Dahlia alerted Gucci. The pair arrived too late, and the ritual went awry, igniting the coal seam fire. Hospitalized and in excruciating pain, Alessa's rage split her soul apart, one half manifesting as the dark entity responsible for the shifting dimensions of Silent Hill. Her remaining innocence manifested as Sharon, who was taken to the real world to be adopted. Desperate to find Sharon, Rose allows Dark Alessa's spirit into her body, allowing it access to the church. Sharon, despite being protected by Dahlia, is captured by the Brethren.

In the church, Christabella burns Cybil as a witch and plans to do the same to Sharon. Rose confronts Christabella, denouncing her as a murderer before Christabella stabs Rose in the heart. Alessa emerges from the blood flowing from the wound as a disfigured being bound to a hospital bed, and tears Christabella and her followers apart with razor wire. Rose rescues Sharon, and Sharon and Alessa/Dark Alessa reunite into one body. Rose and Alessa leave the town and return home. Upon arriving, they discover they are still in the foggy dimension, separated from reality. Meanwhile, Christopher awakens alone in the real world and discovers that the front door has mysteriously opened.

Cast
 Radha Mitchell as Rose Da Silva, the desperate mother who seeks a cure for her daughter Sharon's nightmarish sleepwalking by taking her to the town of Silent Hill.
 Sean Bean as Christopher Da Silva, the father of Sharon and husband of Rose who opposes his wife's decision to find answers in Silent Hill.
 Laurie Holden as Cybil Bennett, the motorcycle police officer from the city of Brahams who becomes suspicious of Rose and follows her into Silent Hill.
 Jodelle Ferland as Alessa Gillespie, a powerful psychic born out of wedlock, who is persecuted and eventually immolated by the Brethren. She also portrays Dark Alessa, the manifestation of Alessa's rage, and Sharon Da Silva, the manifestation of Alessa's innocence, who is eventually adopted by Rose and Christopher.
 Lorry Ayers portrays the adult Alessa Gillespie, who was kept alive for 30 years in the basement of a hospital and eventually returns as a scarred woman to exact her revenge upon the Brethren.
 Deborah Kara Unger as Dahlia Gillespie, the mother of Alessa who walks the foggy dimension of Silent Hill after giving her daughter up for sacrifice. She is a much more sympathetic character in the film, compared to her game counterpart.
 Alice Krige as Christabella, the fanatical and delusional high priestess of the Brethren, who burn those deemed as "witches" to prevent the Apocalypse and maintain a sinless existence. Though her character doesn't exist in the games, her motive and backstory was instead taken from the game version of Dahlia.
 Kim Coates as Officer Thomas Gucci, a kind-hearted police officer jaded and hardened by his experiences in Silent Hill.
 Tanya Allen as Anna, the youngest Brethren member who was born in the foggy dimension of Silent Hill, and has no knowledge of the outside world.
 Roberto Campanella as Pyramid Head, a tall humanoid monster wearing a pyramid-shaped helmet wielding a large great knife. Campanella also portrayed Colin, the school janitor, and the monster version of Colin after being punished by Alessa. Additionally, Campanella was the movement coordinator for the other creatures that were used in the movie.
 Christopher Britton as Adam, a Brethren member.
 Nicky Guadagni as Eleanor, Anna's mother.
 Emily Lineham as Lisa Garland (credited as "Red Nurse"), a nurse who was horribly scarred by Alessa just for peeking into her burn tent, and as one of the Dark Nurses Rose encounters in the hospital.
 Eve Crawford as Sister Margaret, the headmistress of the orphanage from which Sharon was adopted.

Production

Development

The idea of the film adaptation of Silent Hill (1999) was voiced by director Christophe Gans for the first time to producer Samuel Hadida during the filming of the film Brotherhood of the Wolf (2001). Hadida, knowing the game's rich visual aesthetics, believed that eerie storytelling matched Gans' encyclopedic knowledge of cinematography. Gans became acquainted with the video game series approximately six years before the release of his film, and initially wanted to adapt the second game (2001) since it was the most "emotional" of all four and the most beloved by fans. He compared it to the myth of Orpheus, who descended into the underworld after Eurydice. However, he said that Silent Hill 2 was not the "real Silent Hill": there was no mythology, and the city only played the role of a backdrop for the unfolding story. As a result, he realized that it was impossible to film an adaptation of the second game without saying a word about the origin of the city.

According to Gans, the first game captivated him with its extraordinary plot: it was so "completely unique" and "absolutely frightening" that it was worthy to become the basis for a real film. Many of his entourage were surprised at the opinion that a banal video game can scare someone. To this, the director replied that Silent Hill was one of the scariest experiences he ever had. He called it "an experiment with a unique and independent world, which is both beautiful and terrible at the same time". Even before the release of Silent Hill 2, Gans sent "a ton of letters" to copyright holders, but received no response. He presented his vision of the film and how important the games are to him in a 37-minute video with Japanese subtitles, which was shown at a meeting of the Konami board of directors. Representatives of the company realized that Gans was the only one among the major studios fighting for the right to film adaptation who understood the essence of the game, and the director received the filming rights after two months, which he sought for a total of five years. The publishers insisted that the project retain the original plot and setting.

Gans had not previously directed any game adaptations, and stated that the process is completely unlike anything else. According to him, in projects of this type, the most important challenge is to bring the background story in the game to the foreground. Hadida said that "Silent Hill is something outside of cinema." He believed that the game was so popular because everyone felt something unique when playing it, and the film only enhances that feeling. The creators have also said that the film is a tribute to the horror genre. Gans considered his film to be halfway between science fiction, Clive Barker's books, and hardcore horror.

Writing

When the decision was made to adapt Silent Hill, Gans and Hadida phoned screenwriter Roger Avary. They outlined their plans and offered to write a script. "It's not so easy", Avary said, "when you're going to film something, especially a game, you need to be ready to take everything apart, and then put it together in a new way. The only thing that remains of the original material is the main idea, the concept, which all your actions are subordinated to." It was decided to combine in-game monsters with creatures invented by the film crew. Gans tried to stick as close to the original source as possible, while Avary saw it as his main task to convey the spirit of the game; he kept some storylines, and tried to combine the rest of the elements into new compositions. Thus, the director was more faithful to the creator's intention, and the screenwriter preferred to interpret the original material broadly.

Since Gans had already formed the concept of the future plot of the film, he sent the screenwriter several discs with "atmospheric" videos to point Avary's work in the right direction, as well as the developments compiled by himself and Nicolas Boukhrief. They were written in French, but the scriptwriter was required to translate them into English, write dialogues and change a few conceptual factors. Avary did not limit himself to acquaintance with the presented film library and personally went through all entries of the game series. All changes made by Avary were translated into Christophe's native language. A rough draft of the work was ready by October 2004. Nevertheless, due to the complete absence of male characters, the script was rejected by the producers; only after the script was modified to include Sean Bean's character and subplot was it approved. Avary recalled that as soon as they received the "stupid note from the studio", Gans got angry. Yet, later they realized that this storyline can be made interesting and emphasize the peculiarities of the perception of reality. As a result, the plot became a combination of the first game with separate elements of the second and third. Gans elaborated: "We weren't trying to put all three games into a two-hour production, this is an adaptation of the first Silent Hill. However, there are so many interesting details [in the following installments] that it was impossible to resist."

Roger Avary regularly received letters from fans, whom he called "crazy". He saved some messages, the senders of which claimed that only they can write the script, and if Roger does not cope with his task, then he will be found and killed. Avary believed these threats were very real. Fans sent him their own versions of scripts to his mailbox, but Avary, saying that "it all smacks of delirium", deleted them without reading.

Avary used the town of Centralia, Pennsylvania as a prototype for the town of Silent Hill; he commented that as a child, his father, who was a mining engineer, used to tell him stories about Centralia, where coal deposits from the local mine caught fire and released toxic gases into the town, as well as creating sinkholes when the abandoned mineshafts and coal seams began to collapse. This forced the town to evacuate forever. Avary was fascinated since childhood by the idea that fires underneath the town would be burning for such a long time. The film acquired its working title in honor of the city — Centralia.

Samuel Hadida tried to approach the writing of the script with the same feelings that arose during the gameplay of Silent Hill. The script also required the creation of a logical splicing between the various levels so that a person not familiar with the game could easily understand what was happening on the screen. The creators were guided by the impressions of the fans, who suggested what impressed them more, what kept them in suspense, which characters seemed the most effective. At the heart of the plot, there is the search for a daughter, which leads the main character. Roger liked long dialogues, while Christophe preferred to shorten them as much as possible. In the end, they managed to achieve balance. Actions accounted for 30 pages, in which Rose explores the world of Silent Hill. There were long debates over the ending. For the ending, Avary wanted to use the theme of forgiveness, while Gans wanted to see a darker ending, the key message of which would be revenge. As a result, Avary gave up as he was convinced by the director's logical arguments.

After taking the script, Radha Mitchell read only 10 pages of text. She was alone in her apartment and, by her own admission, she felt uncomfortable with fear. She finished reading it only a week later in the light of the sun, and said: "That's what attracted me to the piece as well because it was definitely a page-turner and it freaked me out". Sean Bean also found the plot scary. In contrast to these impressions, Laurie Holden liked the script — she deemed it spectacular, complex, multi-level with wonderful themes and therefore interesting to work with. Deborah Kara Unger called it "Alice in Wonderland meets Dante's Inferno".

Concept 

An integral part of the Silent Hill universe is the reality and unreality of the city. Silent Hill exists simultaneously in four different variations: the city of the 1970s, Silent Hill in the present, Silent Hill in the fog, and Silent Hill in the darkness. Two of the above measurements are based on temporal changes — one represents the city of thirty years ago and is used only in flashbacks, the other displays the current state of the city to which Christopher goes in search of his wife and daughter. The two remaining dimensions include a foggy day in which Rose searches for her daughter, symbolizing purgatory, and a gloomy day, consisting of enveloping darkness, which is the embodiment of Hell. Gans reported that in his work he tried to discover new dimensions of space and time in metaphysical and mystical aspects. He stated, "We're not trying to explain everything, as I prefer people to find meaning in this story themselves. It is much more pleasant to enjoy the understatement. It's kind of a playful invitation to be smart".

According to executive producer Andrew Mason, Silent Hill is a story of what happens in the moments between death and fate. The film talks about people who deny their own fate and therefore fall into the trap of alternate dimensions. It "deals with the terror of loneliness, the fear of the dark, the fear of taking responsibility for your own evil side, and the fear of your own fate". The game created a sense of constant threat, while the film "seeks to reproduce that experience for a wider audience".

The film's leitmotif is motherhood, faith and persecution, presented at a symbolic level. Motherhood represents a form of the virgin birth. In addition to Rose, the key characters in the themes of the dramatic structure are the childless Cybil, Dahlia, and Christabella; the latter of whom lost her child, believing that abandoning motherhood is a blessing for society. Gans stated that motherhood in the film is about "Immaculate Conception — motherhood achieved in the noblest way." By the time Silent Hill comes to its denouement, which takes place in the sanctuary of the sect, the film turns into a cautionary tale warning against religious fanaticism. The director noted that monotheistic religions constantly attacked the idea of femininity, but the film, at the same time, is not moralizing.

Gans described the concept of the town's connection to the child Alessa and the cult: "It's a town of people trapped in dark dreams, and she inflicts onto the town what those people did to her body. That is, to me, the meaning of the darkness. The appearance of the town is corrupted in the way that her own flesh was wounded." He furthers expands on Alessa's connection to the alternate reality seen in the film, saying that the alternate reality is "in [Alessa's] head". "It's interesting because the town itself mirrors this fractured psychology—different dimensions, different doubles of the same person." In speaking about the creatures in Silent Hill, Gans said that "these monsters are [damned], with the poetic direction of the term: they are a little like the Japanese phantoms, i.e. residues of forgotten feelings as strong as hatred or [guilt]." "The monsters in the game are not really monsters, but rather a mockery of human beings. The real monsters are the people, the cultists who tortured Alessa. When I approached the film, I knew that it was impossible to represent the monsters as simply beasts that jump on you."

Influences 
The appearance of the games in the series was largely influenced by Adrian Lyne's film Jacob's Ladder (1990), especially the subway and hospital scenes. Gans believed that the film crew was able to create a unique piece that did not rely on the style of Lyne's film. Gans' film adaptation is not an imitation of Lyne's film, as Silent Hill has long evolved into a completely separate phenomenon that exists on its own. The film was influenced by the work of Sergio Leone and David Lean: the city of the seventies was created under the inspiration of the films Lawrence of Arabia (1962) and The Good, the Bad and the Ugly (1966), and in general, it was filmed under the influence of various works ranging from a book of pictures about Chernobyl to The Matrix In the film, Gans paid homage to the works of Salvador Dalí, Hans Bellmer, Francis Bacon, Jean Cocteau, Alberto Giacometti, Clive Barker, H. P. Lovecraft, David Cronenberg and Michael Mann.

According to the director's initial idea, six Pyramid Heads were to be present in the film's denouement, destroying the sectarians with various weapons, which was supposed to be an allusion to the events of Dante's Inferno. But due to budgetary constraints, the final scene was changed. In it, Alessa kills cultists with barbed wire — this sequence was inspired by the anime Urotsukidōji. In one of the scenes, Rose tries to remember how to get to the hospital room, and, studying the map, says: "down, down, left, right, left, right". Valery Korneev considered this scene a reference to the Konami Code, describing it as a barely noticeable curtsey towards the adult gamer audience. The ringtone on Rose's phone matches that of Solid Snake every time he receives a coded message. The director drew parallels between Avary's script and episodes of The Twilight Zone (1959–1964). Based on the film, a literary adaptation of the same name was written in Japanese by Paula Edgewood and Osamu Makino.

Characters and casting 
The director noted that in the game, each character is very emotional and vulnerable, but at the same time the characters were called flat and schematic. After they were put on paper, Gans realized that the result was a failure. The actors represented more expansive and complex personas, so many of the characters were revamped. The filmmakers wanted all the characters in the film to appear gray and murky, as if they were in different dimensions simultaneously. When selecting actors, Christophe paid attention to those people who worked in independent cinema, as they brought a "different quality".

The protagonist of the original video game is a man named Harry Mason. The director of the film made a significant departure from the original source and replaced the main character with a woman, Rose Da Silva. Cristophe and the writers suddenly realized that they were working "with a completely feminine world". Gans explained that if you look closely at the game and do not take into account the appearance, you can see that the characters behave more like women than like men. They are worried about the child, they are very sensitive and often cry — all this is stereotypical for mother characters. "The whole movie is about motherhood", the director said. He believed that in any sinister story there must be a "saving grace". This change, despite the fact that Gans himself is a fan of the media franchise, did not bother him in the least "because the game is a game, and the film is a film".

The creators spent a lot of time and effort to find an actress for the role of Rose, sophisticated and defenseless, who had the right amount of sensitivity in her character. They needed an actress with a vulnerable image, full of determination. The audience had to worry about Rose and at the same time admire her ability to get out of various difficult situations with honor. Milla Jovovich and Meg Ryan auditioned for the role, but in the end the choice fell on Australian Radha Mitchell, previously known for her roles in 2004 films such as Woody Allen's Melinda and Melinda, Tony Scott's Man on Fire, and Marc Forster's Finding Neverland. Mitchell herself became interested in the project mainly because of Gans' personality — she was deeply impressed by his previous film, Brotherhood of the Wolf. The executive producer of the film, Andrew Mason, noted that Mitchell had the freshness, energy and joy of life necessary for the main character, who will lead the audience through a terrible world. Gans characterized Mitchell as a sophisticated and elegant sixties-style actress, reminiscent of Grace Kelly and Mia Farrow. Radha said that during the filming, she had to run a lot around the set and shout "Sharon" in 50 different ways. Also during the filming process, her attitude towards the character changed. She stated that there is something feminist in the concept of the film, since all female characters are in some kind of fantasy world, while men are only in reality. For the main character, about a hundred costumes were created, each of which was slightly darker than the previous one. In the beginning, Rose is dressed in a very light dress, and in the end — in a blood red, which symbolizes her evolution.

Ten-year-old Jodelle Ferland played three roles at once — her character exists in the Silent Hill universe in several incarnations: Sharon is the embodiment of "all the best" that was in the immolated Alessa, the suffering Alessa and the demonic Dark Alessa. The filmmakers intended to cast three different girls for these roles, but, nevertheless, a young actress was found capable of portraying these roles at the same time. Gans saw Ferland as "the ideal actress", drawing attention to her performance in the Kingdom Hospital miniseries and Terry Gilliam's Tideland. After Jodelle made her audition statement "I've always wanted to play the devil", and the director watched 15 hours of footage featuring the actress, she was approved for the role. Ferland, who had 26 acting credits at the time, reported that she has already played several girls similar to her character from the film: "I usually get creepy roles, like Dark Alessa". Gans supported Ferland's performances with "a combination of charm and gentle direction".

The role of Sean Bean, who plays Rose's husband, Kim Coates, who plays the police officer Gucci, and all the related storylines were missing from the initial script. They were introduced after the producers familiarized themselves with the initial version of the script and a note sent to the director about the need to introduce male characters into the film. Sean Bean was the only one of all the actors in the lead roles who did not even try to play the game — he just saw the game packaging. He described his character as someone who is constantly between despair and determination to see the case through. Christopher tries to get to the bottom of it, no matter what it costs him. He is a successful businessman and a loving husband who senses the presence of evil. There is a certain nostalgia in his relationship with Rose. The actor for the role of Christopher was selected as the last one. The character was named after the director. The prototype of Cristopher was the game's protagonist Harry Mason. Coates considered Silent Hill to be the strangest film he had ever starred in. His character officer Gucci's name is briefly mentioned in one of the notes found in the game — in it, he is described as a narcotics officer who suddenly dies of a heart attack.

Gans cast Holden after seeing her in The Majestic, stating, "in The Majestic, she was beautifully feminine and I cast her so I could show her other side, make her strong and sleek." To prepare for her role, Krige read the book The End of Days by Erna Paris, a book about tyranny during the Spanish Inquisition.

Filming
The film was greenlit on September 19, 2003. Principal photography commenced on April 25, 2005. It was filmed in both Brantford and Hamilton as well as on soundstages in Toronto in 2005 and on location in Alma College. American studio Sony Pictures bought the distribution rights for $14 million for the United States and Latin America to be released under its TriStar Pictures genre film subsidiary.

The film was shot in the Super 35 film format, except the scenes with the darkness, which were filmed in high-definition video, because of its ability to cleanly capture light and digitally manipulate it in post-production. The film contains around 107 different sets specifically used to represent the different versions of the town. The bipedal creatures in the film were played by professional actors or dancers covered in latex and prosthetic makeup. After filming, over 619 visual effects shots were used in the film, with the most prominent uses being the fog that drenches the town, the transitions to darkness, and the insects that surround Pyramid Head. Rotoscoping was used to add the fog and ash effects to shots including live-action actors, and the film made extensive use of set extensions as backdrops.

To maintain the feel of the games, Gans had the sound designer of the original Silent Hill, Akira Yamaoka, flown to the set several times. Additionally, Gans had a 40-inch television brought onto the set, to which he attached a PlayStation 2; Gans then played the original Silent Hill on the system so that the actors and cinematographers could see how Gans wanted to emulate various camera angles and movements.

Budgetary concerns caused a few scenes in the film to be rewritten. The meeting of Anna originally featured her being attacked by an injured armless creature, where she is saved by Cybil and Rose. Due to budget concerns, choreographer Roberto Campanella was sent home for the day, and without him the scene did not meet Gans's expectations. To rectify this, the scene was simplified and rewritten. Gans stated that his original vision of the film's finale revolved around six Red Pyramids appearing inside the church, each carrying a different weapon, and slaughtering the cult members in reference to Dante's Inferno. When budgetary and time constraints prevented this ending from being filmed, he created the new ending that revolved around the barbed wire slaying of the cult by Alessa, which was inspired by the erotic anime Legend of the Overfiend.

Soundtrack
The score consists almost entirely of music from Yamaoka's soundtracks to the original four games in the series. The only other piece of music used in the film is Johnny Cash's "Ring of Fire". Yamaoka's scores were arranged by film composer Jeff Danna, with some tracks appearing in almost identical form to their in-game counterparts, while others were recreated entirely.

Release
Silent Hill was released to theaters on April 21, 2006, in the United States, Canada, the United Kingdom, and Ireland. France, Belgium, Hungary, and Greece also saw April releases. It was released in Australia on August 31, 2006. The film was later released in 19 other countries in 2006 which include Russia, Germany, Spain, Italy, Japan, and Mexico. The film's poster of a mouthless Alessa was the subject of some vandalism, with many malefactors drawing cartoon mouths (smiling, screaming, sporting vampire fangs, etc.) or placing stickers where her mouth would be.

Home media
On August 22, 2006, Sony Pictures Home Entertainment and TriStar Pictures released the DVD, Blu-ray, and UMD versions of the film in North America. The DVD and Blu-ray were released in both Anamorphic Widescreen 2.35:1 and pan and scan versions and both included a Dolby Digital 5.1 audio track. The releases also included a number of special features, such as film previews and a six-part making-of documentary. The film was also released on UMD for Sony's PlayStation Portable on August 22, 2006; there are no special features but the disc includes a 1.78 widescreen format, Dolby Digital 2.0, and subtitles. An HD DVD was released in Germany by Concorde Home Entertainment on August 22, 2007, containing the film encoded in the VC-1 video codec and also has the main audio track in DTS-HD, and retaining the film aspect ratio of 2.35:1.

On July 9, 2019, Shout! Factory released a 2-disc Collector's Edition Blu-Ray of Silent Hill through their "Scream! Factory" label.  In addition to containing previous special features, the Collector's Edition also featured new bonus content, including cast and crew interviews, a commentary track with cinematographer Dan Laustsen, and a new HD remaster of the film.

Reception

Box office
Silent Hill opened in 2,932 theaters and earned $20 million in the US on its opening weekend and opened at number one at the U.S. box office. The film grossed over $46 million in the US and $100 million total worldwide. The film sold 1,316,169 DVDs in 4 weeks, grossing $22.1 million, and making the total gross of the film jump to $120 million worldwide. Silent Hill has landed in the top 10 highest-grossing film adaptations of video game properties listed on Box Office Mojo (from 1980 to present) at No. 9, grossing $47 million in the US, just behind Resident Evil: Extinction, which grossed $50.6 million in the US.

Critical response
According to the distributor, advance screenings of Silent Hill were never given to critics. The site's critical consensus reads, "Silent Hill is visually impressive, but as with many video game adaptations, it's plagued by inane dialogue, a muddled plot, and an overlong runtime." Audiences polled by CinemaScore gave the film an average grade "C" on an A+ to F scale.

James Berardinelli of ReelViews awarded the film two and a half stars out of four, opining that it "is overlong, with too many unnecessary scenes" and that "a lot of the movie seems like pointless running around", but added that it "looks great" and "packs in a few scary moments and offers a nicely ambiguous conclusion". Roger Ebert of the Chicago Sun-Times gave one and a half stars out of four, calling it "an incredibly good-looking film", but noting that he "did not understand the story" and criticizing how "all through the movie, characters are pausing in order to offer arcane back-stories and historical perspectives and metaphysical insights and occult orientations". Don R. Lewis of Film Threat praised the visuals but wrote that "this entire film is downright confusing and not in an intriguing way", calling it "the best-looking bad film I've ever seen".

Owen Gleiberman of Entertainment Weekly gave a score of D+, stating that "a few of the images are startling" but "Silent Hill is mostly paralyzing in its vagueness". Dennis Harvey of Variety opined that "above-average interest is generated for a time by [the] elaborate visual package", but "in the end, Silent Hill degenerates into an overblown replay of all those Twilight Zone and Stephen King stories in which outsiders stumble upon a time-warped location from which there's no escape". According to Nathan Lee of The New York Times, "It begins as a quest, develops into a ghost-town mystery, devolves into a preposterous cautionary tale about witchcraft and religious fundamentalism, and wraps up like the outrageously overwrought fantasy of a movie nerd obsessed with horror who has been given obscene amounts of money to adapt a video game."

In 2019, CBR wrote, "Silent Hill (2006) was not the first videogame adaptation that ever made it to the screen, but it's arguably the best one." Flixist called the film "easily one of the best video game based movies ever made". In 2022, Polygon wrote, "While horror-seekers and video game fans of 2006 bristled at the fact that the movie didn’t stay true to the source material, a decade of (mostly) bad Silent Hill entries has proven just how good the movie really was."

Sequel

A sequel, Silent Hill: Revelation, taking place six years after the first film's events, was released on October 26, 2012. Christophe Gans could not direct the sequel because he was busy directing an Onimusha film adaptation. Roger Avary was originally attached to write the screenplay and had written the first draft before he was arrested for vehicular homicide in November 2010. M. J. Bassett was later hired to write and direct the sequel. The sequel was panned by critics, holding  rating on Rotten Tomatoes.

On 31 January 2020, Christophe Gans expressed an interest in working on another Silent Hill film. On October 19, 2022, a sequel to the first film was announced to be in early development, referred to as Return to Silent Hill.

See also
List of films based on video games

Notes

References

External links
 
 
 
 
 

2006 horror films
French horror films
English-language Canadian films
English-language French films
Live-action films based on video games
Films about parallel universes
Films set in ghost towns
Films set in West Virginia
Films shot in Hamilton, Ontario
Films shot in Toronto
2000s monster movies
Films with screenplays by Roger Avary
Silent Hill
Canadian splatter films
Canadian supernatural horror films
TriStar Pictures films
Works based on Konami video games
Films set in 2004
2006 films
Films directed by Christophe Gans
Films produced by Don Carmody
Films scored by Jeff Danna
Religious horror films
2000s English-language films
2000s Canadian films
2000s French films